Colegio Peruano-Alemán Beata Imelda is a German international school in Lurigancho-Chosica, Lima Province, Peru. It serves years 1-12.

References

External links
 Colegio Peruano-Alemán Beata Imelda 
 Colegio Peruano-Alemán Beata Imelda 

German international schools in Peru
International schools in Lima